Events from the year 1687 in Ireland.

Incumbent
Monarch: James II

Events
January 8 – the Roman Catholic Richard Talbot, 1st Earl of Tyrconnell, is appointed Lord Deputy of Ireland.
Early – the Lord Chancellor of Ireland, Sir Charles Porter, is dismissed on a charge of taking bribes and replaced by Sir Alexander Fitton, a Protestant who converts to Catholicism.
October – the Roman Catholic Thomas Nugent is appointed Lord Chief Justice of Ireland in succession to William Davys.

Births
Arthur Blennerhassett, lawyer and politician (d. 1758)
John Maxwell, 1st Baron Farnham, peer and politician (d. 1759)
Thomas Sheridan, Anglican divine and writer (d. 1738)
1686/1687 – Bridget Kavanah, claimed supercentenarian (d. 1805)

Deaths
November 26 – Vere Essex Cromwell, 4th Earl of Ardglass, peer (b. 1625)
Roger Boyle, Church of Ireland Bishop of Clogher (b. 1617?)
William Burke, 7th Earl of Clanricarde, peer.
William Davys, Lord Chief Justice of Ireland (fl. 1633)

References

 
Years of the 17th century in Ireland
1680s in Ireland
Ireland